Regino Hernández Martín (born 25 July 1991 in Ceuta) is a Spanish snowboarder.

Career
On 29 March 2011, he won a gold medal in snowboard cross at the 2011 FIS Junior World Championships in Valmalenco, Italy.

Regino participated for the first time at the Olympic Winter Games in Vancouver 2010 where he was 31st. He was eliminated at the 1/8 round. Four years later in Sochi 2014 he reached the quarterfinals where he was eliminated finished 21st. In Pyeongchang 2018 he reached the final and achieved the bronze medal. It was Spain's first medal at the Winter Olympics since 1992.

His first World Cup podium was in La Molina, Spain on 15 March 2014.

World Cup podiums

Individual events

Team events

Olympic results

Notes

References

External links
 
 
 
 

Spanish male snowboarders
Snowboarders at the 2010 Winter Olympics
Snowboarders at the 2014 Winter Olympics
Snowboarders at the 2018 Winter Olympics
Olympic snowboarders of Spain
Sportspeople from Ceuta
1991 births
Living people
Olympic bronze medalists for Spain
Olympic medalists in snowboarding
Medalists at the 2018 Winter Olympics
21st-century Spanish people